is a Japanese footballer.

Career statistics

Club
.

Notes

References

External links

2001 births
Living people
Japanese footballers
Association football midfielders
Kwansei Gakuin University alumni
J3 League players
Gamba Osaka players
Gamba Osaka U-23 players